Gaillac is a commune in the Tarn department in southern France. It had in 2013 a population of 14,334 inhabitants.

Its inhabitants are called Gaillacois.

Geography

Gaillac is a town situated between Toulouse, Albi and Montauban. It has gained much recognition due to the wines that bear the town's name. The river Tarn runs along the border of the town by the south, east and west. It lies 50 km north-east of Toulouse. It is a market town and is the commercial centre of the north-west of Tarn.

The local wine of Gaillac, first made almost two thousand years ago, is of two official appellations (AOC). The terroir is made up of clay, limestone, sand and silex soils. Gaillac receives more sunshine than Bordeaux and is graced by a cool maritime climate. Duras is the name both of the grape that is native to this area and of an AOC and town just northwest of the two "Gaillac" designations.

History

The town was founded in the second century CE by the Gauls who created a river port where they exported their wine into Gallia Narbonensis. When Aquitania was conquered by Rome, Gaillac gained prosperity with its wine. However, the barbarian invasions annihilated the town and left nothing behind. It was only when the monks of Saint-Michel gained viticulture privileges from the Bishop of Albi, in 972, that the population stabilized and Gaillac started to become a town again. Their wines were at first sent to Bordeaux where they would be exported to England. The Abbey of St. Michel was constructed in the 10th century and rebuilt in 1271. In 1524 the abbey was secularized but the title of abbey retained.

During the religious wars, the "Gaillacois" refused to change their religion and remained Catholics and were chased out of the town by Protestants. They took refuge at Castelnau-de-Montmiral. After the St. Bartholomew's Day massacre on 24 August 1572, in Paris, the Gaillacois massacred 74 out of the 90 Huguenots in the town. The abbey was once again rebuilt between 1572-1620. In the seventeenth century the Chateau of Foucaud was erected.

It was from the town of Gaillac that Louis-Philippe I addressed the words:
Nous chercherons à nous tenir dans un juste milieu, également éloigné des excès du pouvoir populaire et des abus du pouvoir royal.

Which may be translated: "We seek to keep ourselves in proper state, aloof from both the excesses of popular power and the abuses of royal power." This sentence would define the July Monarchy.

Population

Administration
The mayors of the town have been:
 Henri Yrissou 1956-1977
 André Saux 1977-1983
 Jacques Dary 1983-1995
 Charles Pistre 1995-2005
 Michèle Rieux 2005–present

Transport

Gaillac station has rail connections to Toulouse, Aurillac, Albi and Rodez. Tessonnières station is on the line to Albi.

Sport
 UA Gaillac - Local rugby team.

Twin towns
 Caspe,

Notable people
Joseph Castagné - Ethnographer and expert on Central Asia.
Fernande Decruck - composer

See also
 Gaillac AOC
 Communes of the Tarn department
 Tourism in Tarn

References

Communes of Tarn (department)
Languedoc